The Smurfs  (French: Les Schtroumpfs) was the first animated adaptation of the popular Belgian comic book series The Smurfs.

The show was produced by TVA Dupuis and aired on RTB (Radio Télévision Belge de la Communauté Française) from 1961 to 1967.  Some of the television episodes from this series were chosen and became a part of the film Les Aventures des Schtroumpfs. The film was released in 1965 in Belgium. Some of the recovered episodes are exhibited in the Belgian Comic Strip Center in Brussels, Belgium.

Episode list

References

Bibliography 

1961 Belgian television series debuts
Wizards in television
The Smurfs
Black-and-white television shows
Television series set in the Middle Ages
Television series based on Belgian comics
Television about magic
French-language television programming in Belgium
Belgian children's animated adventure television series
Belgian children's animated fantasy television series